Macleania is a genus of plants in the family Ericaceae.

Description
They are epiphytic or terrestrial shrubs. Alternate leaves, petiolate, coriaceous, pinnatinervias or plinervias. Subfasciculate or racemose inflorescences, axillary or terminal, with few to numerous flowers, bibracteolate pedicels, deciduous bracteoles; hypanthium articulated with the pedicel, cylindrical or campanulate; calyx limb erect and patent, (3–) 5-lobed, lobes subacute and triangular; corolla subcylindrical or elongated urceolate, 5-parted, triangular lobes, acute to subacute; stamens usually 10, equal, usually about half as long as corolla, filaments free or connate, anthers strong with strongly granular thecae, tubules nearly as long as anther sacs, or laterally connate or fused to form a tubule simple, rarely completely free, opening by elongated free or fused slits, introrse; style threadlike and about the same length as the corolla or longer, ovary 5-locular. Fruit a berry with numerous small seeds

Taxonomy
The genus was described by William Jackson Hooker and published in Icones Plantarum 2:t. 109. 1837, based on a specimen brought from Peru. Johann Friedrich Klotzsch identified ten species in 1851. Later Hooker separated Psammisia from Macleania. Oscar Drude (1891) and William Wright Smith (1942), as well as other botanists, pointed out the remarkable nature of this genus and its relationship with Psammisia.  Macleania was named for John Maclean (1786-1857), a Scottish merchant who exported plants from Lima, Peru.

Species include:

References

External links

Vaccinioideae
Ericaceae genera
Taxonomy articles created by Polbot